The Mbale–Bulambuli–Siti Medium Voltage Power Line is a medium voltage electricity power line (33kV), under construction, connecting the medium voltage substation at Siti II Hydroelectric Power Station in Bukwo District, in the Eastern Region of Uganda, to another medium voltage substation in the city of Mbale, the largest urban centre in Uganda's Eastern Region.

Location
The 33 kilo Volt power line starts at the Umeme Limited (Umeme) 33kV substation at Mbale, Mbale District, in Uganda's Eastern Region. Due to the steep terrain, the power line does not always follow the winding road. The line measures only , from Mbale to Siti II Power Station.

Overview
The power line is being developed to evacuate the 16.5 megawatts of electricity generated at Siti II Hydroelectric Power Station and transmit it to Mbale were it will be distributed to industrial, commercial and domestic customers. Siti II Power Station is expected online in the 3rd quarter of 2020.

The metropolis of Mbale attained city status on 1 July 2020. Before that, their electricity consumption was no more than 20 megawatts. In 2019, peak demand in Mbale increased by 5 percent. This transmission line together with other distribution enhancements within the city, will result in the availability of 61 megawatts of electricity by December 2020.

Associated power infrastructure
As part of this power line, Umeme is also installing a switching station and plant house at its existing Mbale substation. In addition, it is installing capacitor banks, aimed at stabilizing the power supply.

Another large infrastructure development in Mbale, is the creation of Tangshan Mbale Industrial Park. The park, which sits on  will host 60 to 80 factories when fully developed. Its peak consumption is calculated at 220 megawatts of electricity at full capacity. Umeme is also constructing a switching station and plant house within the industrial park, to stabilize the electricity to industrial standards.

At a later date, Uganda Electricity Transmission Company Limited (UETCL) plans to develop the 132kV Mbale–Bulambuli High Voltage Power Line, at which time the 33kV medium voltage line will plug into the high voltage line, for better stability of the network.

Cost and construction
The power line and associated infrastructure developments are budgeted at US$9.23 million (UShs34 billion). Construction started in June 2019 and is expected to conclude in August 2020. The Tangshan Mbale Industrial Park Project will cost US$5.99 million (UShs22 billion). Work started in May 2020, with completion expected in December 2020. Funding is provided 100 percent by Umeme Limited.

See also
Energy in Uganda
List of power stations in Uganda

References

External links
 Website of Umeme Limited

High-voltage transmission lines in Uganda
Energy infrastructure in Africa
Energy in Uganda